The vice-chancellor of the University of Calcutta, a university in Kolkata, India, is the executive head of the university. Following the establishment in 1857, James William Colvile served as the first vice-chancellor of the university.

List of vice-chancellors

References 

University of Calcutta
Vice-Chancellors by university in India